Yanaki Smirnov (born 20 December 1992) is a Bulgarian footballer who plays as a forward for Dorostol.

Career

Early career
Yanaki moved to Greece with his family where he started his career in the local Panathinaikos. A year later his family returned to his hometown of Varna, where he joined Spartak Varna's academy. He spent one year in Hristo Stoichkov's academy at the Vilafranca football club. After that he joined Litex Lovech academy. He later moved again to Spartak Varna.

Lokomotiv Gorna Oryahovitsa
In the summer of 2014, Smirnov signed with the B Group team Lokomotiv Gorna Oryahovitsa. He scored a goal in his debut for Loko against Loko Mezdra. He scored 13 goals in his first 9 matches. He became the top goalscorer of B Group with 23 goals scored in 26 matches.

Ludogorets Razgrad
On 7 July 2015, Smirnov signed a contract with Ludogorets Razgrad II, the B team of Bulgarian champions Ludogorets, who play in Bulgaria's 2nd league B Group. He chose Ludogorets team over CSKA Sofia. He made his debut for Ludogorets II on 25 July 2015 in a match against Dunav Ruse.

On 23 September 2015 he made his debut for Ludogorets Razgrad in a match for the Bulgarian Cup against Lokomotiv 1929 Mezdra, scoring a goal in the 5:0 win.

On 22 May 2015 he made his complete debut in the A Group for Ludogorets in a match against Beroe Stara Zagora.

Loan to Lokomotiv Gorna Oryahovitsa
On 17 June 2016 Smirnov joined Lokomotiv Gorna Oryahovitsa for the second time, but now on loan for a season. His loan was ended on 28 December 2016 and he returned it Ludogorets doubles. A week after he was released from Ludogorets.

Botev Vratsa
On 11 April 2017, Smirnov signed with Botev Vratsa.  In May 2018, his contract was terminated by mutual consent.

Dobrudzha Dobrich
In June 2018, Smirnov joined Dobrudzha Dobrich.

Career statistics

Club

Honours

Club
Litex Lovech
 A Group. (1): 2010–11

Neftochimic Burgas
 B Group. (1): 2012–13

Individual
 Bulgarian B Football Group – Top scorer: 2014–15 (23 goals)

References

External links

 
 

1992 births
Living people
Bulgarian footballers
Association football forwards
First Professional Football League (Bulgaria) players
Second Professional Football League (Bulgaria) players
PFC Litex Lovech players
PFC Spartak Varna players
Neftochimic Burgas players
FC Lokomotiv Gorna Oryahovitsa players
PFC Ludogorets Razgrad II players
PFC Ludogorets Razgrad players
FC Botev Vratsa players
PFC Dobrudzha Dobrich players
FC Chernomorets Balchik players
FC Pomorie players
Sportspeople from Varna, Bulgaria